Little Razorback Island is the smallest and easternmost of the Dellbridge Islands, lying in Erebus Bay off the west side of Ross Island, Antarctica. It was discovered by the British National Antarctic Expedition under Robert Falcon Scott, 1901–04, and so named because of its size and similarity to nearby Big Razorback Island.

See also 
 List of antarctic and sub-antarctic islands

References

Ross Archipelago